"Dark Necessities" is a song by American rock band Red Hot Chili Peppers and is the first single from their eleventh studio album, The Getaway. After announcing the single through their Twitter page on May 2, 2016, the single was released three days later on May 5, 2016. The music video was released on June 16, 2016. The song was released as a limited edition cassette single that was included in a deluxe package of The Getaway available only through the band's website.

"Dark Necessities" was successful on the Billboard charts, becoming the band's 13th number-one single and 25th top ten single on the Alternative Songs chart, both of which are records for any artist. The song is also the fourth song ever to reach number one on the Alternative Songs chart, the Mainstream Rock chart, and the Adult Alternative Songs chart.

"Dark Necessities" made its live debut on May 22, 2016 at the Rock on the Range festival in Columbus, Ohio.

A live version recorded at Canal+ Studios in Paris, can be found on the Live in Paris EP.

Background
In a June 7, 2016, video interview for the band's YouTube channel, Anthony Kiedis discussed the song saying that many of the songs were created on their own. However, "Dark Necessities" was one of the songs that the band had written with Brian Burton aka Danger Mouse. Kiedis said that he went to Hawaii and worked on the lyrics to the song, which "speaks to the beauty of our dark sides and how much creativity and growth and light actually comes out of those difficult struggles that we have on the inside of our heads that no one else can see." Kiedis also said that the song meant a lot to Burton and it was one of his favorites. He said that Burton fought for "Dark Necessities" to be the first single. However, the band wanted "The Getaway" to be the first single while the label and managers wanted the song "Go Robot" to be the first single.

Critical reception 
"Dark Necessities" was placed at number 12 on Rolling Stone’s "50 Best Songs of 2016" list, writing: “Their big comeback hit collabo with Danger Mouse, with Anthony Kiedis getting personal about his darkest, druggiest memories over a Flea bassline full of blood, sugar, sex and magic.”

Music video
The video, directed by Olivia Wilde, was released through the band's Facebook page on June 16, 2016. Chris Blauvelt served as the cinematographer. The music video features long boarders (Carmen Shafer, Amanda Caloia, Amanda Powell, and Noelle Mulligan) skating around a grocery store, abandoned streets, and the Los Angeles River, interspersed with the band playing the song.

Personnel
Red Hot Chili Peppers
Anthony Kiedis – lead vocals
Flea – bass guitar, piano
Chad Smith – drums, percussion
Josh Klinghoffer – guitars, backing vocals

Additional musicians
Daniele Luppi – string arrangement
Peter Kent – violin
Sharon Jackson – violin
Briana Bandy – viola
Armen Ksajikian – cello

Charts

Weekly charts

Year-end charts

Certifications

References

2016 songs
2016 singles
Red Hot Chili Peppers songs
Danger Mouse
Warner Records singles
Songs written by Flea (musician)
Songs written by Anthony Kiedis
Songs written by Josh Klinghoffer
Songs written by Chad Smith
Songs written by Danger Mouse (musician)